Illinois Route 26 (IL 26, Illinois 26) is a north–south state highway in central and north-central Illinois. It runs from Illinois Route 116 just north of East Peoria to Highway 69 at the Wisconsin border near Orangeville.

Route description 
Illinois 26 is a two to four lane surface highway for the majority of its length. Its southern terminus is just one mile (1.6 km) north of the McClugage Bridge carrying U.S. Route 150 into Peoria.

Illinois 26 mostly follows the east bank of the Illinois River until it crosses the river at Hennepin. It runs concurrent with Illinois Route 29, its Illinois River west bank counterpart, at Bureau and with U.S. Route 52 near Freeport.

History 
SBI Route 26 originally ran from Freeport to Polo, on part of current IL-26. In 1937, IL-26 was extended from Freeport to the WI state line,  in place of IL-74, and extended from Polo to Bureau along US-52 to Dixon, and replacing IL-89 from Dixon to Bureau. In 1969, it was extended south to East Peoria replacing IL-87.

In northern Stephenson County, IL 26 originally ran through downtown Orangeville and the unincorporated community of Oneco. In 1990, it was rerouted onto a new at-grade bypass around the village, decreasing travel time.

IL-26 was rerouted onto the nearby I-180 bridge over the Illinois River near Hennepin during the 1990s. The older IL-26 bridge, half a mile south of I-180, was removed after 1999. the old approaches are now local roads, used mainly as access to riverside industries on both banks.

Major intersections

References

External links

Illinois Highway Ends: Illinois Route 26

026
Ronald Reagan Trail
Transportation in Tazewell County, Illinois
Transportation in Woodford County, Illinois
Transportation in Marshall County, Illinois
Transportation in Putnam County, Illinois
Transportation in Bureau County, Illinois
Transportation in Lee County, Illinois
Transportation in Ogle County, Illinois
Transportation in Stephenson County, Illinois